Eden Collinsworth (born August 4, 1952) is an American writer of fiction and nonfiction, whose extensive career has been in media and international business.

Career

Collinsworth began her career in book publishing at Doubleday & Company. She joined Arbor House Book Publishing Company in 1976, and was named its president and publisher in 1983. During her tenure, the company published authors Elmore Leonard, A.R. Gurney, Anthony Burgess and Ken Follett, among others.

Collinsworth founded BUZZ, Inc. In October 1990, with two partners, Allan Mayer, and Susan Gates, Collinsworth, as president and CEO, launched BUZZ Magazine, a Los Angeles-based monthly, city magazine. With contributing editors ranging from Jan Morris and Charles Bukowski to Edward Humes and Edmund White, BUZZ drew unanimous praise for its editorial quality and was nominated for a National Magazine Award in 1996.

From 1999 to 2008, Collinsworth was vice president of The Hearst Corporation and its director of cross media business development responsible for identifying business opportunities across all Hearst divisions, including magazines, newspapers, cable, syndication, and broadcast.

In 2008, Collinsworth became vice president, COO and chief of staff of The EastWest Institute, an international think tank with centers in New York, Brussels, Moscow and Washington, D.C.

In 2011, Collinsworth launched Collinsworth & Associates, a Beijing-based consulting company, which specializes in intercultural communication. She is the author of a best-selling book on the subject published by Xiron Publishing Company in China and has been featured on CNN and the BBC.

Collinsworth has been profiled in Fortune magazine; Vanity Fair; The New York Times; The Wall Street Journal and The Financial Times. She is the author of several works; It Might Have Been What He Said; a play, The Strangeness of Men and Women; a memoir, I Stand Corrected: How Teaching Manners in China Became Its Own Unforgettable Lesson; and the non-fiction work Behaving Badly: The New Morality in Politics, Sex, and Business, as well as What the Ermine Saw: The Extraordinary Journey of Leonardo’s da Vinci’s Most Mysterious Portrait.

References

Living people
1952 births
20th-century American businesspeople